Monique Drost (born 8 October 1964) is a retired Dutch swimmer who won a bronze medal in the 4 × 100 m freestyle relay at the 1981 European Aquatics Championships. She also competed at the 1980 Summer Olympics in the 100 m freestyle.

Monique is not related to Olympic swimmers Frank Drost and Peter Drost. After retiring from competitive swimming she worked as a swimming coach.

References

External links

Monique DROST. les-sports.info

1964 births
Living people
Olympic swimmers of the Netherlands
Swimmers at the 1980 Summer Olympics
Dutch female freestyle swimmers
Sportspeople from Amersfoort
European Aquatics Championships medalists in swimming
20th-century Dutch women